A commodity is a fungible good or service. It may also refer to:

 Commodity (Marxism), any good or service provided by human labour and sold on the general market
 Commodity (album), 2014 album by the Christian rock band Remedy Drive

See also 

 Commodity money
 Commodity market
 Commodity fetishism